André Coumans (10 April 1893 – 8 March 1958) was a Belgian horse rider who competed in the 1920 Summer Olympics. In 1920 he and his horse Lisette won the silver medal in the team jumping competition.

References

External links 
 profile

1893 births
1958 deaths
Belgian male equestrians
Belgian show jumping riders
Olympic equestrians of Belgium
Equestrians at the 1920 Summer Olympics
Olympic silver medalists for Belgium
Olympic medalists in equestrian
Medalists at the 1920 Summer Olympics
20th-century Belgian people